Bù Đăng is a rural district of Bình Phước province in the Southeast region of Vietnam. As of 2003 the district had a population of 108,855. The district covers an area of 1,488 km². The district capital lies at Đức Phong.

References

Districts of Bình Phước province